This is a list of Japanese veterans (Navy or Army) who took part in overseas interventions from 1894 to 1927.

Chinese-Japanese War (1894-95)

Kantarō Suzuki: commanded a torpedo boat during Sino-Japanese War; participated in night torpedo assault on Wei-hai-wei (Lt)
Aritomo Yamagata: Commanding General, First Army, Sino-Japanese War

Russo-Japanese War (1904-05)

Sadao Araki: Company Commander, 1st Infantry Regiment, Imperial Guard Division during Russo-Japanese War
Prince Kuni Kuniyoshi: during the Russo-Japanese War, he served as a major in the infantry assigned to the staff of General Kuroki Tamemoto, commander of the First Army
Jirō Minami: Company Commander, 1st Cavalry Regiment, Russo-Japanese War (took part in assault on Port Arthur)
Toshizō Nishio: participated in Russo-Japanese War, infantry battalion adjutant, 40th Infantry Regiment
Kantarō Suzuki: commanded 4th Destroyer Division, which picked up survivors of the Port Arthur Blockade Squadron, during Russo-Japanese War (Commander)
Jun Ushiroku: 53d Infantry Regiment (Russo-Japanese War)
Otozō Yamada: participated in Russo-Japanese War; captured by the Soviet Army at the end of World War II and accused of involvement with human experimentation performed by the Japanese Army in Manchuria

Japanese Intervention in Siberia (1918-1927)

Korechika Anami: Staff Officer, Sakhalin Expeditionary Army
Sadao Araki: Staff Officer, Expeditionary Army Headquarters, Vladivostok
Kitsuju Ayabe: Siberian Expeditionary Army (Cavalry)
Shōjirō Iida: participated in Siberian Expedition
Koreshige Inuzuka: naval officer
Shigenori Kuroda: Amur Railway Detachment Headquarters
Masutaro Nakai: Siberian Expedition, 1919–20
General Ohi: Japanese commander in Amur-Vladivostok area in the period of the Russian Far East administration
Jun Ushiroku: Staff Officer, 5th Division (Vladivostok)
Norihiro Yasue: Siberian Expeditionary Army

Military history of Japan